Romapuri Pandian is a 2014-2016 Tamil historical drama that aired Monday through Friday on Kalaignar TV from 26 May 2014 to 29 April 2016 at 9:00PM (IST) for 543 episodes. The show written by Karunanidhi and Creative director by Kutty Padmini.

The show starred O.A.K. Sundar, Devipiriya, Lavanya, Yuvanraj Nethran, Murali Krrish, Vetri and Sathya among others. It was produced by Kutty Padmini for Vaishnavi Media Works Limited, director by Danush.

Plot summary
Romapuri Pandian is a historical novel that talks about the king Peruvazhuthi Pandian who tries to establish a relationship with the Roman Empire. "The serial will reflect the Tamil culture of a bygone era in an entertaining manner," adds the representative.

Cast
 O.A.K. Sundar  as Karikalan
 Sathya as Killi Vallabha
 Yuvanraj Nethran as Manimaran
 Murali Krrish as Mahendran
 Devipiriya as Muthunagai
 Lavanya as Princess Thamarai
 Shwetha as Princess Malarkodi
 Shamili as Princess Kalaivani
 Shilpa as Rani Mangamma
 Minnal Deepa as Karun Kuzhali
 Shaji Jaganathan
 Abhinaya Murali
 Sreenidhi as Perunthevi
 Poorni as Vana Mohini
 Vetrimaran
 Abith Singh as Mangamma's son
Divya Krishnan

Awards

International broadcast
The Series was released on 26 May 2014 on Kalaignar TV. The Show was also broadcast internationally on Channel's international distribution. It was aired in Sri Lanka, Singapore, Malaysia, South East Asia, Middle East, Oceania, South Africa and Sub Saharan Africa on Kalaignar TV and also aired in United States, Canada, Europe on Kalaignar Ayngaran TV. The show's episodes were released on Kalaignar TV YouTube channel.

See also
 List of programs broadcast by Kalaignar TV

References

External links
 http://www.kalignartv.com

Kalaignar TV television series
Tamil-language historical television series
2014 Tamil-language television series debuts
2010s Tamil-language television series
Tamil-language television shows
2016 Tamil-language television series endings